John Haley (1931 – December 4, 2003), born in Hot Springs, Arkansas, was an attorney in Little Rock, Arkansas.  He attended Emory University, where he served as president of the student body and as vice-president of the National Student Government Association.  He then attended the University of Arkansas Law School, where he served as editor-in-chief of the law review.  After clerking for the Arkansas Supreme Court, he joined the Rose Law Firm.  In the 1960s, he led the Election Research Council, which exposed and combatted voter fraud in the State of Arkansas.   In 1967, Haley was appointed to the Board of the Arkansas Department of Corrections, which oversees the Arkansas state prison system.  As Chair from 1968 to 1972, Haley interviewed more than 100 inmates and led major reform efforts.  

In the 1990s, John Haley came into front page national news as a result of the Whitewater investigations.  Haley was a close personal friend and attorney for convicted Arkansas governor Jim Guy Tucker.  On February 20, 1998, John Haley pleaded guilty to one misdemeanor count of "willful failure to supply information to an accounting firm" to the Internal Revenue Service.  On August 20, 1998, Haley was sentenced to three years of probation and eight hours a week of community service. He was fined $30,000 and ordered to pay back $40,000 to the IRS. 

On December 4, 2003, Haley was killed in a crash during an attempted landing at the Boone County airport in northwest Arkansas. One passenger, Farish Kincaid, was also killed.

References
  

 Caught In The Whitewater Net, CBS, May 19, 1998
 Caught in the Whitewater Quagmire, Washington Post, August 28, 1995; Page A01    

2003 deaths
1931 births
Victims of aviation accidents or incidents in the United States
Whitewater controversy